is a Japanese manufacturer of optical equipment for ophthalmology and surveying.

History

September 1932—TOPCON was established based on the surveying instruments division of K. Hattori & Co., Ltd. (currently SEIKO HOLDINGS CORPORATION) in order to manufacture the optical instruments for the Japanese Army, which are surveying instruments, binoculars and cameras.
Corporate Name: Tokyo Kogaku Kikai Kabushikikaisha (Tokyo Optical Co., Ltd.)
Head Office: 2, Ginza 4-chome, Kyobashi-ku, Tokyo
Factories: Toshima-ku and Takinogawa-ku, Tokyo

April 1933—Built head office and main factory at 180, Shimura-motohasunuma-cho, Itabashi-ku, Tokyo (current address) and moved head office functions there.

August 1945—Temporarily closed factories after the end of World War II. Received authorization from Tokyo governor to convert the factory for production of civil products and reopened factory to manufacture binoculars and surveying instruments.

December 1946—Established Yamagata kikai  kogyo kabushikikaisha. (currently Topcon Yamagata Co., Ltd.) in Yamagata-shi, Yamagata Prefecture.

December 1947—Started selling lens meters. Started Ophthalmic and Medical Instruments business.

May 1949—Listed its stock on Tokyo and Osaka Stock Exchanges.

1957-released its first SLR camera, the Topcon R with semi-auto lens and interchangeable finder

March 1960—Became an affiliate of Tokyo Shibaura Electric Co., Ltd. (currently Toshiba Corporation).

May 1963—Released the first single-lens reflex camera with through the lens metering (TTL) - TOPCON RE Super

October 1969—Established Tokyo Kogaku Seiki Kabushikikaisha (currently OPTONEXUS Co., Ltd.) in Tamura-gun, Fukushima Prefecture.

April 1970—Established Topcon Europe N.V.(currently Topcon Europe B.V.) in Rotterdam, The Netherlands.

September 1970—Established Topcon Instrument Corporation of America (currently Topcon Medical Systems, Inc.)

January 1975—Established Topcon Sokki Co., Ltd. (currently Topcon Sales corporation), a surveying instrument sales company.

December 1976—Established Topcon Medical Japan Co., Ltd., a medical instrument sales company.

April 1978—Started selling an electric distance meter DM-C1 adopting a near-infrared. 
October 1978—Started selling a refractometer RM-100 incorporating near-infrared beam and a television system.

March 1979—Established Topcon Singapore Pte. Ltd. in Singapore.

April 1986—Established Topcon Optical (H.K.) Ltd. in Hong Kong. September 1986 Listed on First Sections of Tokyo and Osaka Stock Exchanges.

April 1989—Changed its corporate name to TOPCON CORPORATION.

April 1991—Entry into electron beam business.

December 1991—Built an engineering center in corporate premises.

September 1994—Established Topcon Laser Systems, Inc. (currently Topcon Positioning Systems, Inc.) in California, U.S.A., acquired Advanced Grade Technology, advanced into machine control business.

October 1994—Delivered a nationwide GPS continuous observation system to Geographical Survey Institute, Ministry of Construction, Japanese Government. S

July 2000—Acquired Javad Positioning Systems Inc. in the United States and started selling precision GPS receivers and related system products.

July 2001—Established Topcon America Corporation in New Jersey, U.S.A., as a holding company. Reorganized the subsidiaries in the United States dividing them into the ophthalmic and medical instrument business and the positioning business.

July 2002—Liquidated Topcon Singapore Pte. Ltd. and established Topcon South Asia Pte. Ltd. in Singapore.

February 2004—Established Topcon (Beijing) Opto-Electronics Corporation in Beijing, China.

July 2005—Reorganized sales subsidiaries in Europe and newly established two firms in the European market - one overseeing eye care business and the other overseeing positioning business - with Topcon Europe B.V. as the holding company.

July 2005—Transferred from part of the Hoya Corporation Vision Care Company's ophthalmic instruments segment in Japan.

April 2006—Implemented two-for-one stock split.

August 2006—Acquired ANKA Systems, Inc., in the United States for full-fledged entry into the ophthalmic network business in the United States.

October 2006—Acquired KEE Technologies Pty Ltd., in Australia for entry into field of agriculture.

April 2007—In order to build a global group and quick business expansion, Topcon adopted three business structure, Positioning Business Unit, Eye Care Business Unit and Finetech Business Unit.

May 2007—Business rights for mobile control (navigation systems, ITS and others) transferred to U.S. subsidiary from Javad Navigation Systems, Inc.

February 2008—Conducted a takeover bid for shares of Sokkia Co., Ltd. and made it a subsidiary to enhance competitiveness of the positioning business in the global market.

July 2008—Established in Turin (Italy) TIERRA SPA, a joint venture with Divitech spa entering in the Telematic and Remote Diagnostic market segments

June 2009—Acquired shares of Italian wireless communications manufacturer DESTURA s.r.l. to strengthen operations in mobile communications, machine controls, and agricultural IT market segments.

October 2009—Established Topcon 3D Inspection Laboratories, Inc., a 3D inspection technology development/design company, in Canada. Entry into the 3D measurement and high-end print board fields.

March 2010—Acquired InlandGEO Holding S.L., the largest dealer in Spain, to enhance sales channels for precision agricultural systems in the European, Middle-Eastern, and African markets.

July 2010—Expanded Chinese subsidiary and established Topcon (Beijing) Opto-Electronics Development Corporation as a manufacturing base in the emerging Chinese market.

July 2010—Reorganized sales subsidiary in Singapore, established Topcon Singapore Holdings Pte. Ltd. as a holding company. Established new Positioning and Eye Care sales companies.

August 2010—Established Topcon Medical Laser Systems, Inc. by acquiring retina and glaucoma business of OptiMedica (U.S.A) and entered therapeutic laser market.

January 2011—Established Topcon Positioning Middle East and Africa FZE to expand Positioning Business in Middle Eastern and African market.

November 2014—Acquired Wachendorff Elektronik GmbH and Wachendorff Electronics Inc.

September 2015—Toshiba sells its shares of Topcon 

April 2018—Established Topcon Healthcare Solutions, Inc. a medical software company based in Oakland, New Jersey. Their primary focus is the eye-care industry.

July 2021—Topcon Corporation acquired VISIA Imaging S.r.l, an ophthalmic device manufacturer headquartered in suburban Florence, Italy

Cameras
Tokyo Kogaku produced cameras, beginning with a 6×4.5 cm medium format model, Lord in 1937. A 127 film camera followed the next year. The Primoflex I twin-lens reflex camera came out in 1951. The Topcon 35A was unveiled in 1953. In 1960 the company produced a 6x9 press camera on order from the Tokyo Metropolitan Police Department. It initially used a Mamiya lens; civilian models became available with Topcon lenses.

With the 35 mm Topcon RE Super of 1963, the company pioneered full-aperture, through-the-lens  metering. Round about 1973 the production of the SLR IC-1 AUTO started; „IC“ means „Integrated Circuit“, used for aperture control.  The company continued to innovate until leaving that line of business in 1981. The Charles Beseler Company imported the camera line into the US, with the RE-Super being rebranded as the Super-D.

In about 1965, the US Navy tested cameras from several Japanese and German manufacturers (including the Nikon F). The Topcon Super D was the winner of this competition, and was used exclusively by the Navy until 1977.

In Australia 

Topcon has since 2003 started operations from their Brisbane office.

Topcon has an office in Technology Park Adelaide at Mawson Lakes, South Australia, and representatives in Sydney.

Topcon Positioning Systems 

Topcon Positioning Systems Inc., provides positioning technology for surveyors, civil engineers, construction contractors, equipment owners and operators.

Topcon Corporation acquired Advanced Grade Technology in 1995 and became known as Topcon Laser Systems.

In August 2000, Topcon acquired JPS Inc., of San Jose, California, a provider of precision GPS and GPS/GLONASS products.

With the introduction of a series of positioning products, Topcon Laser Systems grew, and consolidated the survey instruments, GPS products and construction positioning products divisions in July 2001. Topcon Positioning Systems was formed.

Topcon Healthcare 

In September 1970, Topcon established Topcon Instrument Corporation of America which is currently Topcon Medical Systems, Inc., a developer and supplier of diagnostic equipment for the ophthalmic community. In April 2018, Topcon established a medical software division, Topcon Healthcare Solutions, Inc., a developer of eyecare software and provider of related healthcare services.

Topcon ophtalmic machines are widely used in many health centers in Western Europe, and are often interconnected to their surrounding IT systems through the RS232 protocol.

Gallery

References

Electronics companies of Japan
Photography companies of Japan
Health care companies of Japan
Lens manufacturers
Navigation system companies
Companies listed on the Tokyo Stock Exchange
Manufacturing companies based in Tokyo
Electronics companies established in 1932
1932 establishments in Japan
Japanese brands